is a 2017 Japanese drama/comedy film directed by Masahiro Kobayashi. The film stars Tatsuya Nakadai and, in part, reflects his own life.

Plot 
Chokitsu is an 84-year-old actor past his prime, who now finds himself unhappy in a luxury retirement village where he was placed by his daughter and son-in-law after the pair took his money. In an attempt to leave, while in his pajamas, he grabs his possessions and makes for the beach. He intends to regain his lost fame and seek a new audience for his talents. Plagued by dementia, he can barely remember past experiences, at times mixing up the characters he has played with his present life, and has trouble recognizing his family members. Chokitsu eventually encounters his estranged younger daughter Nobuko, but due to dementia he doesn't recognize her. She scolds him as she is his only daughter who cares for him.

Cast 
Tatsuya Nakadai as Chokitsu Kuwabatake
Haru Kuroki as Nobuko
Mieko Harada as Yukiko 
Kaoru Kobayashi
Hiroshi Abe as Yukio

References

External links
 

2017 films
2010s Japanese-language films
2010s Japanese films
Japanese comedy films
Films set in Ishikawa Prefecture